Ian Hennessy (born 10 January 1967) is an Irish soccer coach and former professional player who was most recently the head coach of the University of Delaware. He came to the United States after being rejected by Arsenal, then returned to Ireland, playing for Cork City in their inaugural season in the League of Ireland during 1984. He also played for the Ireland youth team.

He was an All-American and twice named Big East Most Outstanding Player whilst with Seton Hall, winning three Big East titles. He then went on to play professional soccer with the Boston Bolts, the New York Fever, the New Jersey Stallions, the Connecticut Wolves, the Reading Rage, and as part of the MetroStars squad under manager Carlos Queiroz in Major League Soccer (MLS) first season in 1996.

Hennessy holds a PhD in Molecular Biology from Columbia University in New York City and a bachelor's degree from Seton Hall.

He has worked as a state and regional coach for the Olympic Development Program (ODP) and served as an assistant to Bob Reasso at Rutgers University in the Big East and Ed Kelly of Boston College in the Atlantic Coast Conference (ACC).  As well as coaching at the University of Delaware, he currently works as a scout for the United States Soccer Federation(USSF).  He was the coach of the Blue Hens until 2021 when he was fired.

References

External links
 Staff profile at the University of Delaware
 Player profile at MetroFanatic.com

1967 births
Living people
Cork City F.C. players
League of Ireland players
Republic of Ireland association footballers
Irish expatriate sportspeople in the United States
Expatriate soccer managers in the United States
Republic of Ireland expatriate football managers
Association footballers from Cork (city)
Seton Hall Pirates men's soccer players
New York Red Bulls players
American Professional Soccer League players
Boston Bolts players
Delaware Fightin' Blue Hens men's soccer coaches
New York Fever players
USISL players
New Jersey Stallions players
Connecticut Wolves players
Reading United A.C. players
Columbia University alumni
Major League Soccer players
Association football midfielders
Republic of Ireland football managers